"Judas", Child ballad 23, dates to at least the 13th century and is one of the oldest surviving English ballads. It is numbered as 23 in Francis Child's collection.

Synopsis
Christ gives Judas 30 pieces of silver to buy food for the Apostles; on his way to the market, Judas is waylaid by his sister, who lulls him to sleep and steals the money. Unwilling to confess his loss, Judas sells Christ to the Romans for the same amount.

See also
List of Child Ballads

References

External links
Judas

13th century in music
English ballads
Child Ballads
Cultural depictions of Judas Iscariot
Songs based on the Bible
Songs about criminals
13th century in England